Kusowo  is a village in the administrative district of Gmina Szczecinek, within Szczecinek County, West Pomeranian Voivodeship, in north-western Poland.

History 
At the time of the foundation of the German Empire in 1871, the Kingdom of Prussia was the largest and dominant part of the empire. Pomerania was taken by the kingdom, and along with a few other places, and would later be called in Germany "Ostgebiete des deutschen Reiches" (Eastern territories of the German Empire).

Pomerelia (now Pomeranian Voivodeship) was handed over to Poland after the Greater Poland Uprising. It was, however, annexed by Nazi Germany during the Second World War. After the war, it was decided in the Potsdam Agreement that the Pomeranian Voivodeship would be returned to Poland.

References

Kusowo